Tha Sop Sao is a village and tambon (subdistrict) of Mae Tha District, in Lamphun Province, Thailand. In 2005 it had a population of  10883 people. The tambon contains 16 villages.

References

Tambon of Lamphun province
Populated places in Lamphun province